Anacyclus pyrethrum, the pellitory, Spanish chamomile, Mount Atlas daisy, bertram, or Akarkara, is a species of flowering plant in the daisy family Asteraceae. It is native to Mediterranean Europe and parts of North Africa, but also naturalised in other parts of Europe, India and Pakistan. This herbaceous perennial resembles chamomile species in habitat and appearance. 

The plants known as pellitory-of-the-wall and spreading pellitory belong to a different family, the nettles (Urticaceae).

Names
Although one might assume from the specific epithet pyrethrum that this plant contains pyrethrins, it does not. Both pyrethrum and "pellitory" derive ultimately from the ancient Greek for "fire" (πῦρ).

Cultivation
Anacyclus pyrethrum var. depressus (sometimes considered a separate species, Anacyclus depressus), called mat daisy or Mount Atlas daisy, is grown as a spring-blooming, low-water ornamental. It produces mats of grey-green, ferny foliage and single daisy-like white flowers. It is suitable for growing in an alpine or rock garden. It has gained the Royal Horticultural Society’s Award of Garden Merit.

Medicinal uses
Extracts of Anacyclus pyrethrum have anabolic activity in mice and also increase testosterone in the animal model.

Ayurveda (the ancient Indian medicine system) and Siddha (the medical system from Tamil Nadu, a southern state of India) have uses for this plant root and it has been used for centuries as a medicine. It is called Akkal-Kara in Hindi, Akkal Kadha in Marathi, and Akkarakaaram (Tamil: அக்கரகாரம்). A kind of oil is prepared by a method known as pit extraction (Tamil: குழி எண்ணெய்).

In The Perfumed Garden (from 15th century Tunisia), al-Nefzawi recommends pelleter taken externally as an ointment on the penis and scrotum or internally to enhance sexual pleasure and enhance erection (ch. 13, 15, 17).

References

External links 

Anthemideae
Medicinal plants of Africa
Medicinal plants of Asia
Medicinal plants of Europe
Plants used in Ayurveda

pl:Bertram lekarski